Loukas Apostolidis (born 23 October 1980, in Berlin) is a Greek professional football goalkeeper. He previously played for Veria FC, from 2005 to 2008 and Super League Greece side Kerkyra FC, from 2008 to 2011, and later moved to Iraklis Thessaloniki.

External links
Profile at The Football League's website
Kerkyra FC Profile Page

1980 births
Living people
Greek footballers
Veria F.C. players
A.O. Kerkyra players
Association football goalkeepers
Footballers from Berlin